Joyita Mondal is the first Bengali trans woman who was a member of a judicial panel of a civil court and a social worker from West Bengal, India.

Early life 
Mondal comes from a traditional Hindu household and suffered a lot of discrimination in her childhood because of her gender identity. She dropped out of school after class 10th. After, she slept at bus stands and begged on streets.

She moved to Islampur in Uttar Dinajpur district and worked for the upliftment of the transgender community. Simultaneously, she also completed her studies through correspondence and got a degree in law. In 2010, she was the first trans person from her district to get a voter ID.

Mondal also started her own organisation, Dinajpur Notun Alo (Dinajpur New Light), that is currently reaching out to and helping thousands of people in her district.

Career 
Mondal is a member of the transgender community of West Bengal and works for the welfare and development of the community. In 2015, Mondal was involved with others in setting up a home for older people who were HIV positive and forming patients' welfare committees.

On July 8, 2017, 29-year old Mondal became the first transgender judge of a Lok Adalat from West Bengal, India. She attended office as judge of a Lok Adalat at Islampur in the North Dinajpur, where some of her first cases involved the recovery of loans made by banks.

References 

Living people
Transgender rights activists
Indian LGBT rights activists
21st-century Indian judges
Indian transgender people
Transgender women
Scholars from West Bengal
Year of birth missing (living people)
Activists from West Bengal